Silvi Jan (born 27 October 1973) an Israeli former footballer who played as a striker. With 29 goals, she is the all-time Israel national team top goalscorer.

Club career
Jan played school football in Netanya, and was part of the boys' football team of Shorashim school. As there was no women's league, Jan tried to find an active team in Europe, eventually signing with Kolbotn I.L. in Norway. In 1999, with the establishment of the Israeli Women's League, Jan returned to Israel and signed with Hapoel Tel Aviv.

Jan played at Hapoel Tel Aviv for four seasons, until the team folded, winning the league and cup in 2000–01. After Hapoel Tel Aviv folded, Jan signed with Maccabi Holon, where she played until her retirement in 2007. With Maccabi Holon Jan won the league 4 times and the cup 5 times.

In January 2009, Jan returned to league action and joined ASA Tel Aviv University. On 21 February 2012, in a league match against her former club, Maccabi Holon, Jan scored her 1000th goal in all club and national team competitions. Jan played at ASA Tel Aviv until her retirement in May 2012. With ASA Tel Aviv Jan Jan won three championships and two cups. Jan scored a total of 1,010 goals in all competitions.

International career
Silvi Jan has been a striker for the Israel national team for many years, appearing in 23 matches and scoring 29 goals. Jan made her debut against Romania on 2 November 1997, and scored her debut goal against Bosnia and Herzegovina on 8 April 2008, one of four she scored on the day.

Her last international goal was also scored against Bosnia and Herzegovina, in a match played on 23 November 2006, in which Israel won 5–2. Jan made her last international appearance against Poland on 10 May 2007.

Personal life
Jan came out as a lesbian in December 2017. She got engaged to her partner in November the following year.

In September 2018. Jan was diagnosed with rheumatoid arthritis.

Honours
Hapoel Tel Aviv
 Ligat Nashim: 2000–01
 Israeli Women's Cup: 2000–01

Haccabi Holon
 Ligat Nashim: 2002–03, 2004–05, 2005–06, 2006–07
 Israeli Women's Cup: 2002–03, 2003–04, 2004–05, 2005–06, 2006–07

ASA Tel Aviv University
 Ligat Nashim: 2009–10, 2010–11, 2011–12
 Israeli Women's Cup: 2010–11, 2011–12

Individual
 Ligat Nashim top goalscorer: 1999–2000, 2006–07, 2009–10, 2010–11, 2011–12
 Israeli Women's Cup top goalscorer: 1999–2000, 2000–01, 2006–07, 2011–12

References

External links
 

1973 births
Living people
Jewish Israeli sportspeople
Lesbian Jews
Footballers from Netanya
Women's association football forwards
Israeli women's footballers
Israel women's international footballers
Israeli lesbians
Israeli LGBT sportspeople
LGBT association football players
Israeli expatriate women's footballers
Expatriate women's footballers in Norway
Israeli expatriate sportspeople in Norway
Toppserien players
Hapoel Tel Aviv F.C. (women) players
Maccabi Holon F.C. (women) players
ASA Tel Aviv University players
Lesbian sportswomen